Aftab ( âftâb, meaning "sun" or properly "sunshine") is a surname and a masculine given name.

Notable people with this given name
 Aftab Ahmad Khan Sherpao, Pakistani politician
 Aftab Ahmed, several people
 Aftab Ali, British Asian politician
 Aftab Baloch, former Pakistani cricketer
 Aftab Gul, former Pakistani cricketer
 Aftab Habib, English cricketer
 Aftab Jawaid, former squash player from Pakistan
 Aftab Ahmad Khan, Pakistan Army Infantry officer
 Aftab Ahmed Khan, Indian politician
 Aftab Shaban Mirani, Pakistani politician
 Aftab Pureval, American politician
 Aftab Sachak, Afghan-born British actor
 Aftab Iqbal Shamim, Urdu-language poet
 Aftab Shamshudeen, Guyanese-born cricketer

Persian masculine given names
Bangladeshi masculine given names
Persian words and phrases